58 Hydrae is a single star in the equatorial constellation of Hydra, located around 290 light years away from the Sun based on parallax. It has the Bayer designation E Hydrae; 58 Hydrae is the Flamsteed designation − a later designation of 6 Librae. It is visible to the naked eye as a faint, orange-hued star with an apparent visual magnitude of 4.42. This object is moving closer to the Earth with a heliocentric radial velocity of −9 km/s.

The suffix notation indicates an underabundance of iron in the spectrum, and some uncertainty about the classification. It is around 8.1 billion years old with 0.88 times the mass of the Sun. As a consequence of exhausting the hydrogen at its core, the star has expanded to 33.4 times the Sun's radius. It is radiating 310 times the luminosity of the Sun from its swollen photosphere at an effective temperature of 4,210 K.

References

K-type giants
Hydra (constellation)
Hydrae, E
Durchmusterung objects
Hydrae, 58
130694
072571
5526